Felimare sycilla is a species of colourful sea slug or dorid nudibranch, a marine gastropod mollusk in the family Chromodorididae.

Distribution 
This species occurs in the Caribbean Sea and the Gulf of Mexico.

Description 

Habitat 

References

Chromodorididae
Gastropods described in 1890